Victor Clinton Hurt (March 13, 1899 – May 17, 1978) was an American football, basketball, and track coach and college athletic administrator. He attended College of Emporia and played football for the Presbies football team.  He began his coaching career in 1920. For 11 years, he coached track, basketball and football and was the athletic director at Oklahoma Baptist University.  During the 1935 season, he was an assistant coach on the 1935 SMU Mustangs football team that went undefeated in the regular season.  He was the head football coach for the Tulsa Golden Hurricane football team during the 1936, 1937, and 1938 seasons. After the 1938 season, he joined the coaching staff at the University of Kansas. He coached for four years at Kansas and, in 1944, he was hired as the manager of the Philbrook Museum of Art in Tulsa.  He later became president of the Southwest Art Association and, in 1958, was inducted into the National Association of Intercollegiate Athletics (NAIA) Hall of Fame.

Head coaching record

Football

References

External links
 

1899 births
1978 deaths
College of Emporia Fighting Presbies football players
Kansas Jayhawks football coaches
Oklahoma Baptist Bison athletic directors
Oklahoma Baptist Bison basketball coaches
Oklahoma Baptist Bison football coaches
SMU Mustangs football coaches
Tulsa Golden Hurricane football coaches
College track and field coaches in the United States